Hyatt Regency Ludhiana is a Hyatt Hotel located on the Chandigarh-Ferozepur road, off of National Highway 95 in Ludhiana’s commercial corridor. It is also in close proximity to the Railway Station and Inter State Bus Terminal (ISBT), just 15 minutes away by car. Hyatt Regency Ludhiana is adjacent to the Wave Mall.

The Hotel
The hotel is owned by The Piccadily group. The hotel has 164 standard rooms including 24 suites. There are two restaurants inside the hotel: Kitchen at 95 and The Gallery Bar. Located on the bustling Ferozepur Road, it is the ideal destination for weddings, product launches, corporate meetings or private events in Ludhiana, Punjab. Furthermore, the hotel offers expertise in handling outdoor catering events ranging from 50 to 1,500 guests with professional services to make your event truly memorable. Over 12177 sq ft  of flexible meeting space including the Regency Ballroom, Four boardrooms located on the 6th Floor that comfortably seat 8 to 10 people each, Regency Room to accommodate 50 persons , Panache ballroom for 120 persons .

References
 Hyatt Thrive Activity 

 Food Festival At Ludhiana

External links
Official Website of Hyatt Regency Ludhiana

Hotels in India
Hyatt Hotels and Resorts
Buildings and structures in Ludhiana
Hotels established in 2013
Hotel buildings completed in 2013